Strobilanthes alternata (synonym Hemigraphis alternata), may be known as red ivy, red-flame ivy, or waffle plant, is a member of the  family Acanthaceae native to Java. It is a prostrate plant with purple colored leaves.

Description
The stems of the plant are prostrate and purplish, especially at the nodes. The leaves are hairy and opposite, and one leaf of a pair is much larger than the other. The leaf blades are dark green on the top face and are lighter green or purplish on the lower face. The flowers of the plant grow from where the leaf meets the stem, and are white with purple penciling.You can call this plant by various names such as Cemetery plant, Purple waffle plant, Murikooti and Ayurveda addresses this plant as Vranaropani (meaning – wound healer). In Kerala, India, we call this herb as Muriyan pacha as it helps to heal wounds faster. This plant is native to the tropical regions of the globe especially tropical Malaysia and South East Asia. This natural herb grows in plenty across India, China, Indonesia, and Japan

Uses
In Indonesia, Strobilanthes alternata is used to promote urination, check and heal hemorrhages, stop dysentery, and treat venereal diseases.

The plant is popular in the United States and rarely the United Kingdom to use in hanging baskets for gardens.The botanical name of Red flame ivy is Hemigraphis colorata Blume.

References

Acanthaceae
Plants described in 1768
Taxa named by Nicolaas Laurens Burman